A Happening of Monumental Proportions (known as A Very Bad Day in some countries) is a 2017 American comedy-drama film directed by Judy Greer in her directorial debut, and produced by Chris and Paul Weitz. It stars Allison Janney and Common. The film was released on September 21, 2018 by Great Point Media.

Plot
Daniel, an account manager (Common) is having a bad day. Gearing up for Career Day at his daughter's elementary school, the new boss fires him when his affair with his married assistant (Jennifer Garner) is revealed.

Lonely Darius, Daniel's boss's (Bradley Whitford) son, finds himself instantly entranced by Patricia, Daniel's daughter (Storm Reid), and seeks advice from their school's shop (John Cho) and music teachers (Anders Holm) on how to win her heart.

Meanwhile, the principal and vice-principal (Allison Janney and Rob Riggle) spend the day trying to hide the school's dead gardener from the faculty and staff, as well as the students and their parents.

The day culminates at the Career Day activity. Both Daniel and his former boss turn up. They begin to have an altercation that they decide to take outside.

At the same time Mr. McRow, and then Darius, wander up on the roof to ponder life. They share feelings about Darius' loneliness and Christian's failure in music. But they connect, while watching the fight between Daniel and Mr. Schneedy. As they are about to go down, Christian falls off the roof and onto the manure pile below, uninjured.

In the end, Darius is able to tell his father he's tired of moving, Patricia's dad meets the husband of his former lover, getting closure, and the coroner finally takes away the dead gardener.

Cast
 Allison Janney as Principal Nichols
 Katie Holmes as Paramedic #1
 Jennifer Garner as Nadine, Daniel’s assistant and Bob’s wife
 Bradley Whitford as Arthur Schneedy, Daniel’s boss
 John Cho as Mr. Ramirez, a teacher
 Common as Daniel Crawford, Patricia’s father
 Anders Holm as Christian McRow
 Storm Reid as Patricia Crawford, Daniel’s daughter
 Rob Riggle as Vice Principal Ned Pendlehorn
 Nat Faxon as Paramedic #2
 Kumail Nanjiani as HR Rep Perry
 Keanu Reeves as Bob
 Jessica Mikayla Adams as Jamie

Reception

On review aggregator Rotten Tomatoes, the film has an approval rating of 29% based on 24 reviews, with an average rating of 3.87/10. Metacritic reports a score of 35/100 based on 9 critics, indicating "generally unfavorable reviews".

References

External links
 
 

American comedy-drama films
2017 directorial debut films
2017 comedy-drama films
2017 comedy films
2010s English-language films
2010s American films